Şerif Cırık, popularly known as Aşık Mahsuni Şerif, was a Turkish ashik, folk musician, composer, poet, and author. Aşık is a title used to indicate his position as a respected musician and his relationship with Alevism.

Early life 
Mahsuni Şerif was born in the Berçenek village of Afşin, Kahramanmaraş, Turkey in 1939. His mother's name is Döndü, his father's name is Zeynel Cırık. There was no primary school in his village, Berçenek. Instead, he studied the Koran in Lütfü Efendi Madrasa, located in the village of Alembey, until he could graduate later on from the local primary school. 

He started playing baglama and writing poems in 1956 while attending military school.

Career 
After Mahzuni left the army, he started to become a public poet by continuing to traditional Turkish Folk poetry. He was writing about political topics and his poems were all about public's problems. For instance one of his poems is about lack of education in villages (school without class [Sınıfsız Okul]). He interested in Turkish Folk tradition since he was 12. He learned playing baglama from his uncle Ashik Fezali (Pehlül Baba).

His first record was released in 1964. He resided in Gaziantep for a while, after he moved to Ankara. He actively worked for the labor party's youth branch in 1963, 1964.

He met with Fikret Otyam. Thanks to him he met with Cüneyt Arcayürek Form Gazette of Hürriyet. First writing in gazette about Mahzuni was written by Cüneyt Arcayürek. He found the Society of Ashiks for public poets. He gave concerts supported by Fikret Otyam and Union of Gazette.

He founded a record firm with the money he earned in 1968. However, he bankrupt with his partners Ayhan Coşkun and Abbas Sütçü in a short time.

In 1989–1991 years he was chosen as one of the World's biggest three poets by the Turkish Folk Poets Federation.

He is known as these folk songs: Dom Dom Kurşunu, Yedin Beni, Yuh Yuh, Fadimem, Gül Yüzlüm, Ciğerparem, Merdo, Dostum, Han Sarhoş Hancı Sarhoş, Çeşmi Siyahım, Yalan Dünya, Ağlasam mı, Abur Cubur Adam, Katil Amerika, Ekmek Kölesi.

His folk songs are vocalized by a lot of folk music and pop music artists. Some of them are Ersen ve Dadaşlar, Edip Akbayram, Cem Karaca, Gülden Karaböcek, Zeki Müren, İbrahim Tatlıses, Ahmet Kaya, Mahsun Kırmızıgül, Murat Göğebakan, Selda Bağcan.

Mahzuni released 453 records, 50 tapes and 9 books.

His Lawsuits 
In 1974, returning from an abroad concert he was arrested. Because, one of a TPFA (Turkey, Public Freedom Army) organization member kidnapped Türkola Records firm owner by saying 'Mahzuni wants you' which was not true. However, he was sentenced to prison for 14–15 months. In the middle of 70's he was prohibited from stages for 8 years and he couldn't go abroad. He made his living by selling records in a little store.

He secretly made records in 1981-82. These records launched in 1986 when his prohibition was removed.

In 1971, due to military coup Süleyman Demirel government overthrown and Nihat Erim government took over. New government was so hard on leftwinger people. So Mahzuni Şerif said a folk song called 'Erim Erim Eriyesin' which is related with new government's president's surname. In Mahzuni's song he is implying that 'you melt for long and long' which is a criticism to his pressure. In conclusion, Mahzuni was arrested and sentenced prison for 10 months.

In 1972, he went to Sivirialan village in Sivas to visit Aşhik Veysel. In 1973 he was arrester for incitement people for crime and he judged in Ankara Court which was governed by military.

In 2001, due to some of his words in an article he was sued. His first court started in December 27 of 2001. When he died in Germany, the case was not concluded.

He was tortured in prison. He was asked a question by a journalist, "Have you ever received a state artist offer? (This offer is a reward for artists which is a great honor in Turkey) Mahzuni replied as 'State rewarded me by pulling my nails in military governed court'.

Death 
He died on May 17, 2002, in Porz, Köln, Germany. He was buried in an area called Çilehane, in Hacı Bektaş Veli Complex, Nevşehir Province.

Şerif became one of Turkey's best-known musical interpreters of Turkish folk music and folk poetry.

References

External links
 Mahzuni Şerif on birikinet.com

1939 births
2002 deaths
People from Afşin
Alevi singers
Turkish folk poets
20th-century Turkish male singers
Turkish Alevis
Ashiks